Anjuman Ara Jamil was a former member of parliament and the widow of Brigadier General Jamil Uddin Ahmad.

Early life
Anjuman Ara Jamil was born in Hashimpur, Kushtia in 1938. She married Jamil Uddin Ahmad. She was elected to parliament from Kushtia.

Death
She died on 29 November 2012 from "old-age complications". She was buried in Dhaka Cantonment Graveyard.

References

1938 births
2012 deaths
Women members of the Jatiya Sangsad
20th-century Bangladeshi women politicians